"Texarkana" is a song from R.E.M.'s studio album Out of Time. Though not released as an official single, it managed to chart at number 4 on the Modern Rock Tracks chart and number 6 on the Mainstream Rock Tracks chart. This song was written, musically and lyrically, by bassist Mike Mills (credited to Berry/Buck/Mills/Stipe), as vocalist Michael Stipe had been having problems for weeks trying to come up with lyrics for it. As a result, Mills also sang lead vocals.

The title is a reference to the city of Texarkana (located on the border of Texas and Arkansas), originally mentioned in the chorus before it was changed. As heard on the Outtakes of Time bootleg as well as Out of Time's 25th Anniversary edition, Stipe's original chorus was "When I'm out in Texarkana / where's that county line / another county line."

Charts

Personnel
R.E.M.
Bill Berry – drums
Peter Buck – guitar
Mike Mills – bass guitar, keyboards, lead vocals
Michael Stipe – backing vocals

Additional musicians
Peter Holsapple – acoustic guitar
David Arenz – violin
Ellie Arenz – violin
Mark Bingham – string arrangements
David Braitberg – violin
Andrew Cox – cello
Reid Harris – viola
Ralph Jones – double bass
John Keane – pedal steel guitar
Dave Kempers – violin
Elizabeth Murphy – cello
Paul Murphy – viola

References

R.E.M. songs
1991 songs
Texarkana
Songs about Texas
Songs written by Bill Berry
Songs written by Peter Buck
Songs written by Mike Mills
Songs written by Michael Stipe
Song recordings produced by Scott Litt
Song recordings produced by Michael Stipe
Song recordings produced by Mike Mills
Song recordings produced by Bill Berry
Song recordings produced by Peter Buck